Lamphey Cricket Club Ground is a cricket ground in Lamphey, Pembrokeshire.  The first recorded match on the ground was in 1995, when Pembrokeshire Under-19 played Glamorgan Under-19.  In 2002, Wales Minor Counties played a Minor Counties Championship match at the ground against Berkshire, the only Minor Counties Championship match on the ground to date.

The ground has also held a single List-A match in the 2004 Cheltenham & Gloucester Trophy which saw Wales Minor Counties against Middlesex.

In local domestic cricket, Lamphey Cricket Club Ground is the home ground of Lamphey Cricket Club.

References

External links
Lamphey Cricket Club Ground on CricketArchive
Lamphey Cricket Club Ground on Cricinfo

Cricket grounds in Wales
Sports venues in Pembrokeshire